Sagnier is a surname. Notable people with the surname include:

Enric Sagnier (1858–1931), Spanish architect
Eugenio Trías Sagnier (1942–2013), Spanish philosopher
Ludivine Sagnier (born 1979), French actress and model
 Sagnier, French umbrella maker in the 19th century